NGC 5466 is a class XII globular cluster in the constellation Boötes. Located 51,800 light years from Earth and 52,800 light years from the Galactic Center, it was discovered by William Herschel on May 17, 1784, as H VI.9. This globular cluster is unusual insofar as it contains a certain blue horizontal branch of stars, as well as being unusually metal poor like ordinary globular clusters. It is thought to be the source of a stellar stream discovered in 2006, called the 45 Degree Tidal Stream. This star stream is an approximately 1.4° wide star lane extending from Boötes to Ursa Major.

See also
 List of stellar streams

References

Further reading

External links

 SIMBAD, NGC 5466 data
 VizieR, NGC 5466
 SEDS, NGC 5466
 Aladin, Image NGC 5466

Boötes
Globular clusters
5466
45 Degree Tidal Stream